The 1986 Baylor Bears football team represented the Baylor University in the 1986 NCAA Division I-A football season. The Bears offense scored 325 points, while the Bears defense allowed 207 points.  The Bears finished the season second in the Southwest Conference. In the Battle of the Brazos, Texas Football magazine voted the 1986 football game between Baylor and Texas A&M the outstanding game of the Southwest Conference]of the 1980s.  Texas A&M overcame a 17–0 deficit, and won the game 31–30 and later advanced to the Cotton Bowl Classic.

Schedule

Roster

Game summaries

USC

    
    
    
    
    

Visiting USC stunned the No. 9 Bears on a 32-yard field goal on the final play. Baylor dominated the game statistically, outgaining USC 408-197, holding a 26-11 advantage is first downs (including not allowing USC a first down through three quarters), and maintaining a 15-minute advantage in time of possession (37:47 to 22:13). Mirroring the result of last year's matchup, the unranked road team knocked off the host with an AP top ten ranking.

After the season

Awards and honors
 Thomas Everett, Jim Thorpe Award

Team Players drafted into the NFL
The following players were drafted into professional football following the season.

References

Baylor
Baylor Bears football seasons
Bluebonnet Bowl champion seasons
Baylor Bears football